Marie of the Incarnation may refer to:
 Marie of the Incarnation (Carmelite) (1566–1618) 
 Marie of the Incarnation (Ursuline) (1599–1672)